Yahweh was an ancient Levantine deity that became the national god of ancient Israel and Judah. The origins of his worship reach at least to the early Iron Age, and likely to the Late Bronze Age if not somewhat earlier, and in the oldest biblical literature he possesses attributes typically ascribed to weather and war deities, fructifying the land and leading the heavenly army against Israel's enemies. The early Israelites were polytheistic and worshipped Yahweh alongside a variety of Canaanite gods and goddesses, including El, Asherah and Baal. In later centuries, El and Yahweh became conflated and El-linked epithets such as El Shaddai came to be applied to Yahweh alone, and other gods and goddesses such as Baal and Asherah were absorbed into Yahwist religion.

Towards the end of the Babylonian captivity, the very existence of foreign gods was denied, and Yahweh was proclaimed as the creator of the cosmos and the One true God of all the world, giving birth to Judaism, which has  14–15 million adherents today. During the Second Temple period, speaking the name of Yahweh in public became regarded as taboo, and Jews instead began to substitute other words, primarily adonai ("my Lord").

Yahweh is also invoked in Papyrus Amherst 63, and in Jewish or Jewish-influenced Greco-Egyptian magical texts from the 1st to 5th century CE.

Name
The god's name was written in paleo-Hebrew as 𐤉𐤄𐤅𐤄 ( in block script), transliterated as YHWH; modern scholarship has reached consensus to transcribe this as Yahweh. The shortened forms "Yeho-" and "Yo-" appear in personal names and in phrases such as "Hallelujah!" The sacrality of the name, as well as the Commandment against "taking the name 'in vain'", led to increasingly strict prohibitions on speaking or pronouncing the term in writing. Rabbinic sources suggest that, by the Second Temple period, the name of God was pronounced only once a year, by the high priest, on the Day of Atonement.

History

Periods
Philip King and Lawrence Stager place the history of Yahweh into the following periods:
 Late Bronze: 1550–1200 BCE
 Iron Age I: 1200–1000 BCE
 Iron Age II: 1000–586 BCE
 Neo-Babylonian: 586–539 BCE
 Persian: 539–332 BCE
Other academic terms often used include First Temple period, from the construction of the Temple in 957 BCE to its destruction in 586 BCE, exilic for the period of the Exile from 586–539 BCE (identical with Neo-Babylonian above), post-Exilic for later periods and Second Temple period from the reconstruction of the Temple in 515 BCE until its destruction in 70 CE.

Late Bronze Age origins (1550–1200 BCE)

In the earliest Biblical literature Yahweh is a storm god typical of ancient Near Eastern myths, marching out from a region to the south or south-east of Israel with the heavenly host of stars and planets that make up his army to do battle with the enemies of his people Israel: 

There is almost no agreement on his origins. His name is not attested other than among the Israelites and seems not to have any plausible etymology,  ehyeh ašer ehyeh ("I Am that I Am"), the explanation presented in Exodus , appearing to be a late theological gloss invented at a time when the original meaning had been forgotten. One scholarly theory is that he originated in a shortened form of ˀel ḏū yahwī ṣabaˀôt, "El who creates the hosts", but this phrase is nowhere attested either inside or outside the Bible, and the two gods are in any case quite dissimilar, with El being elderly and paternal and lacking Yahweh's association with the storm and battles.

The oldest plausible occurrence of his name is in the phrase "Shasu of Yhw" (Egyptian:  yhwꜣw) in an Egyptian inscription from the time of Amenhotep III (1402–1363 BCE), the Shasu being nomads from Midian and Edom in northern Arabia. The current consensus is therefore that Yahweh was a "divine warrior from the southern region associated with Seir, Edom, Paran and Teman". There is considerable although not universal support for this view, but it raises the question of how Yahweh made his way to the north. An answer many scholars consider plausible is the Kenite hypothesis, which holds that traders brought Yahweh to Israel along the caravan routes between Egypt and Canaan. This ties together various points of data, such as the absence of Yahweh from Canaan, his links with Edom and Midian in the biblical stories, and the Kenite or Midianite ties of Moses, but its major weaknesses are that the majority of Israelites were firmly rooted in Palestine, while the historical role of Moses is highly problematic. It follows that if the Kenite hypothesis is to be maintained, then it must be assumed that the Israelites encountered Yahweh (and the Midianites/Kenites) inside Israel and through their association with the earliest political leaders of Israel.

Iron Age I (1200–1000 BCE)

Iron Age I corresponds approximately to the Judges period of the Bible.  During this period, Israel was a confederation of tribes, each of which was (by then) a territorial entity with boundaries and rights. Although the Biblical account draws a clear distinction between Israelites and Canaanites in this period, and this was followed in early scholarship, the modern consensus is that there was no distinction in language or material culture between these groups. Scholars accordingly define Israelite culture as a subset of Canaanite culture.

With the notable exception of Yahweh himself, the deities worshipped by Israel were also Canaanite.  These included El, the ruler of the pantheon, Asherah, his consort, and Baal.

In the earliest Biblical literature, Yahweh has characteristics of a storm god typical of ancient Near Eastern myths, marching out from a region to the south or south-east of Israel with the heavenly host of stars and planets that make up his army to do battle with the enemies of his people Israel:

Iron Age II (1000–586 BCE)

Iron II saw the emergence of nation states in the Southern Levant, including Israel, Judah, Philistia, Moab, Ammon, Edom and Phoenicia. Each kingdom had its own national god: Chemosh was the god of the Moabites, Milcom the god of the Ammonites, Qaus the god of the Edomites, and Yahweh the god of Israel. In each kingdom the king was also the head of the national religion and thus the viceroy on Earth of the national god.

Yahweh filled the role of national god in the kingdom of Israel (Samaria), which emerged in the 10th century BCE; and also in Judah, which emerged probably a century later (no "God of Judah" is mentioned anywhere in the Bible).  During the reign of Ahab (c. 871–852 BCE), and particularly following his marriage to Jezebel, Baal may have briefly replaced Yahweh as the national god of Israel (but not Judah). 

In the 9th century BCE, there are indications of rejection of Baal worship associated with the prophets Elijah and Elisha. The Yahweh-religion thus began to separate itself from its Canaanite heritage; this process continued over the period from 800 to 500 BCE with legal and prophetic condemnations of the asherim, sun worship and worship on the high places, along with practices pertaining to the dead and other aspects of the old religion. Features of Baal, El, and Asherah were absorbed into Yahweh, El (or el) became a generic term meaning "god" as opposed to the name of a specific god, and epithets such as El Shaddai came to be applied to Yahweh alone. 

In this atmosphere a struggle emerged between those who believed that Yahweh alone should be worshipped, and those who worshipped him within a larger group of gods; the Yahweh-alone party, the party of the prophets and Deuteronomists, ultimately triumphed, and their victory lies behind the biblical narrative of an Israel vacillating between periods of "following other gods" and periods of fidelity to Yahweh.

Neo-Babylonian and Persian Periods (586–332 BCE)

In 587/6 BCE Jerusalem fell to the Neo-Babylonians, Solomon's Temple was destroyed, and the leadership of the community were deported. The next 50 years, the Babylonian exile, were of pivotal importance to the history of Israelite religion.  As the traditional sacrifices to Yahweh (see below) could not be performed outside Israel, other practices including sabbath observance and circumcision gained new significance.  In the writing of second Isaiah, Yahweh was no longer seen as exclusive to Israel, but as extending his promise to all who would keep the sabbath and observe his covenant.  In 539 BCE Babylon in turn fell to the Persian conqueror Cyrus the Great, the exiles were given permission to return (although only a minority did so), and by about 500 BCE the Second Temple was built.

Towards the end of the Second Temple period, speaking the name of Yahweh in public became regarded as taboo. When reading from the scriptures, Jews began to substitute the divine name with the word adonai (אֲדֹנָי‬), meaning "Lord". The High Priest of Israel was permitted to speak the name once in the Temple during the Day of Atonement, but at no other time and in no other place. During the Hellenistic period, the scriptures were translated into Greek by the Jews of the Egyptian diaspora. Greek translations of the Hebrew scriptures render both the tetragrammaton and adonai as kyrios (κύριος), meaning "the Lord". After the Second Temple was destroyed at the end of the Siege of Jerusalem (70 CE), the original pronunciation of the tetragrammaton was forgotten.

The period of Persian rule saw the development of expectation in a future human king who would rule purified Israel as Yahweh's representative at the end of time—a messiah. The first to mention this were Haggai and Zechariah, both prophets of the early Persian period. They saw the messiah in Zerubbabel, a descendant of the House of David who seemed, briefly, to be about to re-establish the ancient royal line, or in Zerubbabel and the first High Priest, Joshua (Zechariah writes of two messiahs, one royal and the other priestly). These early hopes were dashed (Zerubabbel disappeared from the historical record, although the High Priests continued to be descended from Joshua), and thereafter there are merely general references to a Messiah of David (i.e. a descendant). From these ideas, Second Temple Judaism would later emerge, whence Christianity, Rabbinic Judaism, and Islam.

Worship

Festivals and sacrifice
The centre of Yahweh's worship lay in three great annual festivals coinciding with major events in rural life: Passover with the birthing of lambs, Shavuot with the cereal harvest, and Sukkot with the fruit harvest. These probably pre-dated the arrival of the Yahweh religion, but they became linked to events in the national mythos of Israel: Passover with the exodus from Egypt, Shavuot with the law-giving at Mount Sinai, and Sukkot with the wilderness wanderings. The festivals thus celebrated Yahweh's salvation of Israel and Israel's status as his holy people, although the earlier agricultural meaning was not entirely lost. His worship presumably involved sacrifice, but many scholars have concluded that the rituals detailed in Leviticus 1–16, with their stress on purity and atonement, were introduced only after the Babylonian exile, and that in reality any head of a family was able to offer sacrifice as occasion demanded. A number of scholars have also drawn the conclusion that infant sacrifice, whether to the underworld deity Molech or to Yahweh himself, was a part of Israelite/Judahite religion until the reforms of King Josiah in the late 7th century BCE. Sacrifice was presumably complemented by the singing or recital of psalms, but again the details are scant. Prayer played little role in official worship.

Temples

The Hebrew Bible gives the impression that the Jerusalem temple was always meant to be the central or even sole temple of Yahweh, but this was not the case. The earliest known Israelite place of worship is a 12th-century BCE open-air altar in the hills of Samaria featuring a bronze bull reminiscent of Canaanite Bull-El (El in the form of a bull) and the archaeological remains of further temples have been found at Dan on Israel's northern border, at Arad in the Negev and Beersheba, both in the territory of Judah. Shiloh, Bethel, Gilgal, Mizpah, Ramah and Dan were also major sites for festivals, sacrifices, the making of vows, private rituals, and the adjudication of legal disputes.

Portrayal
Yahweh-worship was famously aniconic, meaning that the god was not depicted by a statue or other image. This is not to say that he was not represented in some symbolic form, and early Israelite worship probably focused on standing stones, but according to the Biblical texts the temple in Jerusalem featured Yahweh's throne in the form of two cherubim, their inner wings forming the seat and a box (the Ark of the Covenant) as a footstool, while the throne itself was empty. There is no universally accepted explanation for such aniconism, and a number of recent scholars have argued that Yahweh was in fact represented prior to the reforms of Hezekiah and Josiah late in the monarchic period: to quote one study, "[a]n early aniconism, de facto or otherwise, is purely a projection of the post-exilic imagination". Other scholars argue that there is no certain evidence of any anthropomorphic representation of Yahweh during the pre-exilic period.

Yahweh and the rise of monotheism
It is unclear when the worship of Yahweh alone began. The earliest portrayals of Yahweh as the principal deity to whom "one owed the powers of blessing the land" appear in the teachings of the prophet Elijah in the 9th century BCE. This form of worship was likely well established by the time of the prophet Hosea in the 8th century BCE, in reference to disputes between Yahweh and Baal. The early supporters of this faction are widely regarded as being monolatrists rather than true monotheists; they did not believe Yahweh was the only god in existence, but instead believed that he was the only god which the people of Israel should worship. 

Finally, in the national crisis of the exile, the followers of Yahweh went a step further and outright denied that the other deities aside from Yahweh even existed, thus marking the transition from monolatrism to true monotheism. The notion that Yahweh is "to be venerated as the creator-god of all the earth" is first elaborated by the Second Isaiah, a 6th-century BCE exilic work, though the case for the theological doctrine again rests on Yahweh's power over other gods rather than independent monotheistic reasoning.

Graeco-Roman syncretism
Yahweh is frequently invoked in Graeco-Roman magical texts dating from the 2nd century BCE to the 5th century CE, most notably in the Greek Magical Papyri, under the names Iao, Adonai, Sabaoth, and Eloai. In these texts, he is often mentioned alongside traditional Graeco-Roman deities and Egyptian deities. The archangels Michael, Gabriel, Raphael, and Ouriel and Jewish cultural heroes such as Abraham, Jacob, and Moses are also invoked frequently. The frequent occurrence of Yahweh's name was likely due to Greek and Roman folk magicians seeking to make their spells more powerful through the invocation of a prestigious foreign deity.

A coin issued by Pompey to celebrate his successful conquest of Judaea showed a kneeling, bearded figure grasping a branch (a common Roman symbol of submission) subtitled BACCHIVS IVDAEVS, which may be translated as either "The Jewish Bacchus" or "Bacchus the Judaean". The figure has been interpreted as depicting Yahweh as a local variety of Bacchus, that is, Dionysus.  However, as coins minted with such iconography ordinarily depicted subjected persons, and not the gods of a subjected people, some have assumed the coin simply depicts the surrender of a Judean who was called "Bacchius", sometimes identified as the Hasmonean king Aristobulus II, who was overthrown by Pompey's campaign. 

In any event, Tacitus, John the Lydian, Cornelius Labeo, and Marcus Terentius Varro similarly identify Yahweh with Bacchus-Dionysus. Jews themselves frequently used symbols that were also associated with Dionysus such as kylixes, amphorae, leaves of ivy, and clusters of grapes, a similarity Plutarch used to argue that Jews worshipped a hypostasized form of Bacchus-Dionysus. In his Quaestiones Convivales, Plutarch further notes that the Jews hail their god with cries of "Euoi" and "Sabi", phrases associated with the worship of Dionysus. According to Sean M. McDonough, Greek speakers may have confused Aramaic words such as Sabbath, Alleluia, or even possibly some variant of the name Yahweh itself, for more familiar terms associated with Dionysus. 

Other Roman writers, such as Juvenal, Petronius, and Florus, identified Yahweh with the god Caelus.

See also

References

Notes

Citations

Sources

 
 
 
 
 
 
 
 
 
 
 
 
 
 
 
 
 
 
 
 
 
 
 
 
 
 
 
 
 
 
 
 
 
 
 
 
 
 
 
 
 
 
 
 
 
 
 
 
 
 
 
 
 
 
 
 
 
 
 
 
 
 
 
 
 
 
 
 
 
  S.v. 77:17.
 
 
 
 
 
 
 Nestor, Dermot Anthony, Cognitive Perspectives on Israelite Identity, Continuum International Publishing Group, 2010

Further reading

 
Conceptions of God
Creator gods
Deities in the Hebrew Bible
Judeo-Christian topics
Reconstructed words
Religion in ancient Israel and Judah
Sky and weather gods
Tetragrammaton
War gods
West Semitic gods
Names of God
Children of El (deity)
Savior gods
National gods